The Eden Brown Estate was a plantation on the island of Nevis in the Caribbean. It is located in Saint James Windward parish. It is now in ruins. The estate is 85 metres above sea level.

Supposedly the ghost of Miss Huggins haunts the grounds, "lamenting her sorrow and searching for her lost love," according to Hubbard.

References

Nevis
Ruins in Saint Kitts and Nevis